The Kickapoo people (Kickapoo: Kiikaapoa or Kiikaapoi) are an Algonquian-speaking Native American and Indigenous Mexican tribe, originating in the region south of the Great Lakes. Today,  three federally recognized Kickapoo tribes are in the United States: the Kickapoo Tribe in Kansas, the Kickapoo Tribe of Oklahoma, and the Kickapoo Traditional Tribe of Texas. The Oklahoma and Texas bands are politically associated with each other. The Kickapoo in Kansas came from a relocation from southern Missouri in 1832 as a land exchange from their reserve there. Around 3,000 people are enrolled tribal members. 

Another band, the Tribu Kikapú, resides in Múzquiz Municipality in the northern Mexican state of Coahuila. Smaller bands live in Sonora, to the west, and Durango, to the southwest.

Name and etymology
According to some sources, the name "Kickapoo" (Giiwigaabaw in the Anishinaabe language and its Kickapoo cognate Kiwikapawa) means "stands here and there," which may have referred to the tribe's migratory patterns.  The name can also mean "wanderer".  This interpretation is contested and generally believed to be a folk etymology.

History

Pre-1800s 

The Kickapoo are an Algonquian-language people who likely migrated to or developed as a people in a large territory along the southern Wabash River in the area of modern Terre Haute, Indiana, where they were located at the time of first contact with Europeans in the 1600s. They were confederated with the larger Wabash Confederacy, which included the Piankeshaw and the Wea to their north, and the powerful Miami Tribe, to their east. A subgroup occupied the Upper Iowa River region in what was later known as northeast Iowa and the Root River region in southeast Minnesota in the late 1600s and early 1700s. This group was probably known by the clan name "Mahouea", derived from the Illinoian word for wolf, m'hwea.

The earliest European contact with the Kickapoo tribe occurred during the La Salle Expeditions into Illinois Country in the late 17th century. The French colonists set up remote fur trading posts throughout the region, including on the Wabash River. They typically set up posts at or near Native American villages. Terre Haute was founded as an associated French village. The Kickapoo had to contend with a changing cast of Europeans; the British defeated the French in the Seven Years' War and took over nominal rule of former French territory east of the Mississippi River after 1763. They increased their own trading with the Kickapoo.

1800s to present 
The United States acquired the territory east of the Mississippi River and north of the Ohio River after it gained independence from the United Kingdom. As white settlers moved into the region from the United States' eastern areas, beginning in the early 19th century, the Kickapoo were under pressure. They negotiated with the United States over their territory in several treaties, including the Treaty of Vincennes, the Treaty of Grouseland, and the Treaty of Fort Wayne. They sold most of their lands to the United States and moved north to settle among the Wea.

Rising tensions between the regional tribes and the United States led to Tecumseh's War in 1811. The Kickapoo were among the closest allies of Shawnee leader Tecumseh. Many Kickapoo warriors participated in the Battle of Tippecanoe and the subsequent War of 1812 on the side of the British, hoping to expel the white American settlers from the region. 

The 1819 treaty of Edwardsville saw the Kickapoo cede the entirety of their holdings in Illinois comprising nearly one-half area of the state, in exchange for a smaller tract on the Osage river in Missouri and $3,000 worth of goods. The Kickapoo were not eager to move, partly as their assigned tract in Missouri was made of rugged hills and already occupied by the Osage, who were their hereditary enemies. Instead, half of the population traveled south and crossed onto the Spanish side of the Red river in modern day Texas. The US government quickly mobilized to prevent this emigration and force their removal to Missouri. This remnant of Kickapoo remained in Illinois under the guidance of Kennekuk, a prominent, nonviolent spiritual leader among the Kickapoo. He led his followers during the Indian Removal in the 1830s to their current tribal lands in Kansas. He died there of smallpox in 1852.

The close of the war led to a change of federal Indian policy in the Indiana Territory, and later the state of Indiana. White American leaders began to advocate the removal of tribes to lands west of the Mississippi River, to extinguish their claims to lands wanted by white American settlers.  The Kickapoo were among the first tribes to leave Indiana under this program. They accepted land in Kansas and an annual subsidy in exchange for leaving the state.

Language 

Kickapoo is dialect of the Fox language closely related to dialects spoken by the Sauk people and Meskwaki people.  They are classified with the Central Algonquian languages, and are also related to the Illinois Confederation.

In 1985, the Kickapoo Nation's School in Horton, Kansas, began a language-immersion program for elementary school grades to revive teaching and use of the Kickapoo language in kindergarten through grade 6. Efforts in language education continue at most Kickapoo sites. 

In 2010, the Head Start Program at the Kickapoo Traditional Tribe of Texas reservation, which teaches the Kickapoo language, became "the first Native American school to earn Texas School Ready! (TSR) Project certification."

Also in 2010, Mexico's Instituto Nacional de Antropología e Historia participated in the elaboration of a Kickapoo alphabet. The Kickapoo in Mexico are known for their whistled speech.

Texts, recordings, and a vocabulary of the language are available.

The Kickapoo language and members of the Kickapoo tribe were featured in the movie The Only Good Indian (2009), directed by Greg Wilmott and starring Wes Studi. This was a fictionalized account of Native American children forced to attend an Indian boarding school, where they were forced to speak English and give up their cultural practices.

Writing system
A Kickapoo alphabet was developed by Paul Voorhis in 1974 and was revised in 1981. A new orthography is used by the Kickapoo Language Development Program in Oklahoma.

Sounds

Consonants 
Eleven consonant phonemes are used in Kickapoo:

Vowels 

 The eight vowel sounds in Kickapoo are: short  and long .

Tribes and communities
Three federally recognized Kickapoo communities are in the United States in Kansas,  Texas, and Oklahoma. The Mexican Kickapoo are closely tied to the Texas and Oklahoma communities.  These groups migrate annually among the three locations to maintain connections. Indeed, the Texas and Mexican branches are the same cross-border nation, called Kickapoo of Coahuila/Texas

Kickapoo Indian Reservation of Kansas 

The tribe in Kansas was home to prophet Kenekuk, who was known for his astute leadership that allowed the small group to maintain their reservation. Kenekuk wanted to keep order among the tribe he was in, while living in Kansas. He also wanted to focus on keeping the identity of the Kickapoo people, because of all the relocations they had done.

The basis of Kenekuk's leadership began in the religious revivals of the 1820s and 1830s, with a blend of Protestantism and Catholicism. Kenekuk taught his tribesmen and white audiences to obey God's commands, for sinners were damned to the pits of hell.  Once the Kickapoo people got relocated to Kansas they resisted the ideas of Protestantism and Catholicism and started focusing more on farming, so they could provide food for the rest of the tribe. After this had happened they remained together and claimed some of the original land that they had before it was taken by Americans.

The largest community on the reservation is the city of Horton. The other communities are:

Muscotah
Netawaka 
Powhattan
Whiting
Willis

Kickapoo Indian Reservation of Texas

The Texas Indian Commission officially recognized the tribe in 1977.

Other Kickapoo in Maverick County, Texas, constitute the "South Texas Subgroup of the Kickapoo Tribe of Oklahoma". That tribe formerly owned  of non-reservation land in Maverick County, primarily to the north of Eagle Pass, but has sold most of it to a developer. It has an office in that city.

Kickapoo Tribe of Oklahoma 

After being expelled from the Republic of Texas, many Kickapoo moved south to Mexico, but the population of two villages settled in Indian Territory. One village settled within the Chickasaw Nation and the other within the Muscogee Creek Nation. These Kickapoo were granted their own reservation in 1883 and became recognized as the Kickapoo Tribe of Oklahoma.

The reservation was short-lived. In 1893 under the Dawes Act, their communal tribal lands were broken up and assigned to separate member households by allotments.  The tribe's government was dismantled by the Curtis Act of 1898, which encouraged assimilation by Native Americans to the majority culture. Tribal members struggled under these conditions.

In the 1930s the federal and state governments encouraged tribes to reorganize their governments. This one formed the Kickapoo Tribe of Oklahoma in 1936, under the Oklahoma Indian Welfare Act.

Today the Kickapoo Tribe of Oklahoma is headquartered in McLoud, Oklahoma.  Their tribal jurisdictional area is in Oklahoma, Pottawatomie, and Lincoln counties. They have 2,719 enrolled tribal members.

See also

Kickapoo whistled speech
Mascouten

Notes

Further reading
 Grant Foreman, The Last Trek of the Indians: An Account of the Removal of the Indians from North of the Ohio River, Chicago: University of Chicago Press, 1946
 Arrell M. Gibson, The Kickapoo: Lords of the Middle Border, Norman: University of Oklahoma Press, 1963
 Mager Elisabeth (2017) Ethnic Consciousness in Cultural Survival: The Morongo Band of Mission Indians and the Kickapoo Traditional Tribe of Texas . American Indian Culture and Research Journal: 2017, Vol. 41, No. 1, pp. 47–72.       
 M. Christopher Nunley, "Kickapoo Indians," in The New Handbook of Texas, Austin: Texas State Historical Association, 1996.
 Muriel H. Wright, A Guide to the Indian Tribes of Oklahoma, Norman: University of Oklahoma Press, 1986
 Joseph B. Herring, Kennekuk: The Kickapoo Prophet, Lawrence: University of Kansas Press, 1988

External links 
 Kickapoo Tribe of Kansas, official website
 Kickapoo Tribe of Oklahoma, official website
 Kickapoo language, alphabet and pronunciation
 Kickapoo Traditional Tribe of Texas, official website
 Matthew R. Garrett, Kickapoo Foreign Policy, 1650–1830,  PhD dissertation, University of Nebraska, 2006, at Digital Commons
Kickapoo Reservation, Kansas and Kickapoo Reservation, Texas United States Census Bureau
 "First Nations: Kickapoo", Lee Sultzman Tolatsga]
 

 
 
Algonquian peoples
Native American history of Indiana
Native American history of Iowa
Native American history of Kansas
Native American history of Minnesota
Native American history of Oklahoma
Native American history of Texas
Native American tribes in Kansas
Native American tribes in Oklahoma
Native American tribes in Texas
Algonquian ethnonyms
Native American tribes in Iowa